Asia Pacific Yo-Yo Championships (AP) is Asia's most renowned and premier yo-yo competition organized by Spinworkx, a company based in Singapore since 2003. The competition has grown steadily since its inception in 2003. Spinners from around the region get to compete with current world champions, trade tips and tricks with the best in the scene, raising the standard of spinning.

Contests
AP has 5 Divisions since 2011.

The 5 Divisions are 1A, 2A, 3A, 4A and 5A

1A is the single unresponsive yoyo category, players are required to use only 1 unresponsive yoyo for their performance.

2A is the double responsive yoyo category, players are required to use 2 responsive yoyos for their performance. This is also known as the hardest yo-yoing style.

3A is the double unresponsive yoyo category, players are required to use 2 unresponsive yoyos for their performance.

4A is the Off-string yoyo category, players are required to use a specially designed offstring yoyo for their performance, there are no limits to how many offstring yoyos you can use in the 4A category

5A is the Off-hand yoyo category, players are required to attach a special counter weight to a single unresponsive yoyo on the string for their performance.

Participating nations
The organizer let players from only Asia-Pacific region compete in all divisions.

Competition Prizes
Prize is given competitors who won 1st to 3rd places. 500 SGD for 1st, 300 SGD for 2nd, 100 SGD for 3rd place.

List of past champions

1A

2A

3A

4A

5A

X
Only in 2003. X was divided into 3 divisions (3A, 4A, 5A).

See also
World Yo-Yo Contest
European Yo-Yo Championship

References

External links
ASIA PACIFIC YO-YO CHAMPIONSHIPS
Spinworkx Pte Ltd.

Yo-yo competitions
Recurring sporting events established in 2003